Albert Satoshi Kobayashi (born December 9, 1924) is an American engineer and scientist.

Early life and education 
Kobayashi was born on December 9, 1924, in Chicago. He graduated from the University of Tokyo with a bachelor's degree in 1947. He earned a master's degree from the University of Washington in 1952 and a doctorate in mechanics from the Illinois Institute of Technology in 1958.

Research and career 
From 1947 to 1950 Kobayashi worked as an engineer at Konishiroku Photo Industry in Japan. From 1953 to 1955 he worked as an engineer at Illinois Tool Works and from 1958 to 1975 at Boeing. He became an assistant professor in 1958 and later professor at the University of Washington. From 1988 to 1995 he was the Boeing Pennell Professor of Structural Analysis. He has been a professor emeritus in the Department of Mechanical Engineering since 1997. His research includes the mechanics of brittle fractures, experimental stress analysis, Moiré interferometry, elasticity theory, statics and dynamics of mechanical structures. In 1997 he received the Japanese Order of the Rising Sun. He was elected to the National Academy of Engineering in 1986, received the Japan Society for the Promotion of Science, and is a Fellow and an honorary member of the Society for Experimental Mechanics. From 1977 to 1984 he was Associate Editor of the Journal of Applied Mechanics.  The International Conference on Computational & Experimental Engineering and Sciences named the Kobayashi Award after him. He was the president of the Society for Experimental Mechanics from 1989 to 1990.

Awards and recognition 
National Academy of Engineering
Fellow of the Japan Society for the Promotion of Science
Fellow of the Society for Experimental Mechanics
Honorary Member of the Society for Experimental Mechanics
American Society of Mechanical Engineers Daniel C. Drucker Medal
American Society of Mechanical Engineers Nadai Medal
Society for Experimental Mechanics M.M. Frocht Award
Society for Experimental Mechanics B.J. Lazan Award
Society for Experimental Mechanics W.M. Murray Lecture Award
Society for Experimental Mechanics F.G. Tatnall Award
Society for Experimental Mechanics R.E. Peterson Award

Translation 
This article is based in part or in whole on a translation of this version of the German Wikipedia article Albert S. Kobayashi. The editors of the original article are listed in its page history. This indication merely indicates the origin of the wording and does not serve as a source for the information in this article.

References 

1924 births
Living people
Members of the United States National Academy of Engineering
University of Washington faculty
American engineers
University of Tokyo alumni
University of Washington alumni
Illinois Institute of Technology alumni
Fellows of the Society for Experimental Mechanics